Polygala nana, commonly known as candyroot or low bachelors' buttons, is a small herbaceous plant native to the southeastern United States. The root has a sweet liquorice flavor when it is chewed, but it is usually hidden underground until the plant flowers. The seeds  of candyroot are dispersed by ants.

Taxonomy
French botanist André Michaux described candyroot as a variety of Polygala lutea in 1803. Swiss botanist Augustin Pyramus de Candolle reclassified it as a species in 1824. The species name is the Latin word nanus "dwarf".

Description
They appear from April to June, from March to October in Alabama, and year-round in the Everglades. The seeds are smaller than 1 mm in size. The edible root tastes of licorice.

Polygala nana resembles Polygala lutea, which is a taller plant. It also resembles the rare species P. smallii of Miami-Dade County, which has seeds longer than 1 mm.

Distribution and habitat
Polygala nana is found across the southeastern United States from far eastern Texas through Louisiana and Arkansas to Florida and north as far as the Carolinas. Arkansas, where it is found in Ashley, Bradley and Calhoun Counties, marks the northwestern limits of its range. It grows in moist soil in meadows or coniferous woodlands.

References

nana
Flora of the Southeastern United States
Plants described in 1803
Taxa named by Augustin Pyramus de Candolle
Taxa named by André Michaux
Flora without expected TNC conservation status